The Hübichenstein is an unusual rock formation in the Harz mountains, 50 meters in height, located on highway B242 about one kilometer northwest of Bad Grund, Lower Saxony, Germany. In 1897 it was crowned with a monument to Kaiser Wilhelm I, in the shape of an eagle with three-meter wingspan.

References 
 Bad Grund: Hübichenstein
 German Wikipedia article

Hills of Lower Saxony
Rock formations of the Harz
Rock formations of Lower Saxony